The Campolungo Pass (Italian: Passo Campolungo) is an Alpine pass connecting Fusio and Prat in the Swiss canton of Ticino. With a height of 2,318 metres above sea level, the Campolungo is the lowest pass connecting the valleys of Maggia and Leventina.

The pass is located between the Pizzo Massari (north) and Pizzo Campolungo (south).

References

External links
Campolungo Pass on Hikr

Mountain passes of Switzerland
Mountain passes of the Alps
Mountain passes of Ticino
Lepontine Alps